Ernst-Toller-Preis is a Bavarian literary prize, awarded every two years in the name of Ernst Toller. The prize money is €5,000.

Recipients 
Source:

1997 
1999 Biljana Srbljanovic
2001 
2003 Juli Zeh
2007 Günter Grass
2009 Gerhard Polt
2013 Christoph Ransmayr
2015 Katja Petrowskaja
2016 
2018 Wolf Biermann
2021

References

External links

Literary awards of Bavaria